Fabriogenia is a genus of spider wasps, described by Nathan Banks in 1941 in his paper "Psammocharidae from the Solomon Islands, Prince of Wales Island and New Caledonia". It is found in various Australian states including Tasmania, as well as some sightings in Malaysia and Papua New Guinea.

Taxonomy
The genus contains three species:
 Fabriogenia canberra Evans, 1972
 Fabriogenia incompta Banks, 1941
 Fabriogenia dilga Evans, 1972

References

Insects described in 1941